Quigg is a surname. Notable people with the surname include:

Chris Quigg (born 1944), theoretical physicist at the Fermi National Accelerator Laboratory
Eoghan Quigg (born 1992), Irish pop singer who appeared in The X Factor in 2008
H. Gerald Quigg (born 1937), American fundraiser at the University of Richmond
Joe Quigg, American basketball player (North Carolina Tar Heels)
Lemuel E. Quigg (1863–1919), United States Representative from New York
Robert Quigg (1885–1955), recipient of the Victoria Cross for bravery in the Battle of the Somme in World War I
Scott Quigg (born 1988), English professional boxer fighting in the super bantamweight division

See also
Eoghan Quigg (album), the debut studio album by Irish pop singer Eoghan Quigg